is a Japanese short track speed skater. He competed in the 2018 Winter Olympics.

External links
 Kazuki Yoshinaga at ISU

References

1999 births
Living people
Japanese male short track speed skaters
Olympic short track speed skaters of Japan
Short track speed skaters at the 2018 Winter Olympics
Short track speed skaters at the 2022 Winter Olympics
Asian Games medalists in short track speed skating
Asian Games bronze medalists for Japan
Short track speed skaters at the 2017 Asian Winter Games
Medalists at the 2017 Asian Winter Games
Short track speed skaters at the 2016 Winter Youth Olympics
21st-century Japanese people
Four Continents Short Track Speed Skating Championships medalists